Laurel Park, formerly Laurel Race Course, is an American thoroughbred racetrack located just outside Laurel, Maryland which opened in 1911.  The track is  miles in circumference. Its name was changed to "Laurel Race Course" for several decades until returning to the "Laurel Park" designation in 1994.

History

Laurel Park Racecourse opened October 2, 1911 under the direction of the Laurel Four County Fair. In 1914, New York businessmen and prominent horsemen, Philip J. Dwyer and James Butler purchased the track and appointed Matt Winn as the general manager. In 1918 the field was used by Army Engineers as a training camp before deployment to France. In 1946, a stable fire broke out with 60 horses saved. In 1947, the Maryland Jockey Club, which owned Timonium and Pimlico, purchased Laurel Park from the Butler estate with the idea of shifting the Pimlico meeting to Laurel. After the Maryland General Assembly rejected the idea of replacing Pimlico with Laurel Park, the track was sold in 1950 to Morris Schapiro who had his youngest son, John D. Schapiro as the track's new president.

From 1950 to 1984, Laurel Park underwent a period of great change. The track was renamed Laurel Race Course and the Washington, D.C. International was introduced at  miles on the turf. In 1953 Laurel opened a new clubhouse and turf club. In 1954, 14 horses were saved from another stable fire. In 1957 the grandstand was remodeled. In an effort to improve conditions for the International, Laurel lengthened its turf course from seven furlongs to one mile in 1959; simultaneously, the main track was extended from one mile to one mile and one-eighth. In 1964, an intentionally set stable fire destroyed 34 horses. In 1965, the trotting track was covered with an artificial 3M "Tartan Turf". Laurel remodeled its clubhouse and grandstand to accommodate winter racing in 1966, enclosing the track's seating area with 30,000 square feet of half-inch-thick glass. In 1967, another fire was set on two stables which was mitigated by new sprinklers. When Laurel was awarded the summer racing dates in 1982, the track installed an air conditioning system in the grandstand and clubhouse. In 1984, the 34-year Schapiro era ended with the sale of the track.

Laurel entered a new era in December 1984, when governor Harry Hughes's selection for Economic Development secretary Frank J. De Francis and his partners, Robert and John "Tommy" Manfuso, purchased the racetrack from Schapiro before racetrack legislation would pose a conflict of interest. Laurel Park Racecourse was updated in 1985 with an innovative creation of the 'Sports Palace'. In August 1989, Frank DeFrancis died and his son, Joe DeFrancis, then served as president of Laurel and Pimlico. In 1994 the track's name returned to "Laurel Park".  Yet more improvements included those to the main entrance, Grandstand interior and backstretch barns.

In 1994, an effort to redevelop land occupied by Laurel Park and its adjacent properties was attempted to relocate the Washington Redskins Stadium at the crossroads of Whiskey Bottom Road and Brock Bridge Road. Citizens and clergy launched a successful effort that killed the proposal. A lack of sufficient parking space was a significant factor in the decision.

In 1999, at Laurel Park, the MJC broke ground on a new $1.85 million backstretch housing project, Laurel Commons, in cooperation with Laurel Quality of Life, Inc., the Enterprise Foundation, Inc. and the Ryan Family Foundation, Inc. In addition, Laurel Park, as part of a $16 million multi-year renovation plan, opened four premier Clubhouse areas: "Tycoons," an upscale cigar and brandy bar with an excellent television presentation of racing and other sporting events; "Sunny Jim's," a simulcast theater with individual carrels, and food & beverage service; "Clocker's Corner," a casual simulcast theater and cafe in a convenient track-side location and the "Kelso Club," a premier accommodation for VIP customers with concierge service. Magna Entertainment Corp. purchased the track on July 15, 2002, and announced an alliance with The Maryland Jockey Club designed to raise the level of Maryland thoroughbred racing to new heights. Another renovation of Laurel Park's track and facility in 2004 to early January 2005 widened both racing surfaces.

After Magna's bankruptcy in 2009, Penn National Gaming and MI Developments began a joint ownership of the Maryland Jockey Club in 2010 for operation of Laurel Park. The Stronach Group bought out Penn National's minority ownership of the Maryland Jockey Club in June 2011. In May 2011, Frank Stronach gave up leadership of MI Development in exchange for Magna's former gaming assets, giving him control over Laurel Park.

In 2013, following a failed attempt to introduce slot machine gambling, Laurel Park owners Stronach Group announced plans to use the Maryland Racetrack Facility Redevelopment Account to fund year-round racing, facility improvements and a tunnel under the adjacent B&O railroad tracks, connecting to a 1000-unit transit-oriented development called Laurel Park Station on the Howard County portion of the Racetrack property. In 2018, the track began using a GPS-based timing system.

In October 2019, as part of an agreement between The Stronach Group and the city of Baltimore to keep the Preakness Stakes at Pimlico Race Course, plans were announced for Laurel Park to undergo facility upgrades. Under the proposal, The Stronach Group would donate both Pimilco and Laurel Park to newly established government entities that would oversee the properties, with Stronach licensed to conduct the race meets. Laurel's grandstand would be demolished and replaced, and new dirt, synthetic and grass surfaces for racing would be installed. New housing for backstretch workers and new barns would also be constructed. The plans would have to be approved by the Maryland state legislature when they convene in 2020, as existing state laws would have to be modified in order for the proposal to be realized.

In April 2021, Laurel's spring racing dates were shifted to Pimlico Race Course on an emergency basis due to issues with Laurel's main track surface.

Highlights of the first 100 years

 Triple Crown winners Sir Barton, War Admiral, Whirlaway, Secretariat and Affirmed won races at Laurel Park during their Hall of Fame careers.
 Classic winners Omar Khayyam (1917 Kentucky Derby), Hourless (1917 Belmont Stakes), Exterminator (1918 Kentucky Derby), High Echelon (1970 Belmont), Riva Ridge (1972 Derby & Belmont), Spectacular Bid (1979 Derby & Preakness Stakes), Bet Twice (1987 Belmont), Go and Go (1990 Belmont) and Barbaro (2006 Derby) also competed at the central Maryland track.
 Seabiscuit prepped at Laurel Park for his famous match race with War Admiral. On October 15, 1938, two weeks before the Pimlico Special, Seabiscuit finished second in the Laurel Stakes, a race he had won the previous year.
 Kelso, the only five-time Horse of the Year, won the 1964 Washington D.C. International in his fourth attempt, beating rival Gun Bow. Kelso finished second in his three previous tries in the International, all by less than a length.
 Sandy Hawley became the first rider in history with 500 victories in a single-season when he guided Charlie Jr. to victory at Laurel Park on December 15, 1973. Hawley finished the year with 515 victories.
 Chris McCarron surpassed Hawley with his 516th winner on December 17, 1974, aboard Oh My Love at Laurel Park. He completed the year with 546 victories.
 Kent Desormeaux broke McCarron's mark when he rode his 547th winner for the year, aboard Gilten, at Laurel Park on November 30, 1989. Desormeaux finished the year with 598 victories, a record that still stands.
 The Maryland Million, an innovative program devised by broadcaster Jim McKay to promote the Maryland breeding industry, debuted at Laurel Park in 1986. The 26th running of the event took place at Laurel on October 1, 2011.
 Edgar Prado became the fourth jockey to win 500 races in a single-season when he reached the wire first aboard Hardball on November 30, 1997, at Laurel Park. Prado ended the year with 536 victories.
 Mario Pino became the 15th rider in North America to reach 6,000 career wins when he guided Pass Play to victory at Laurel Park on November 7, 2007.
 Rapid Redux joined Zenyatta and Peppers Pride as the only horses in North American thoroughbred history to win 19 consecutive races in a row after he out stepped four starter allowance runners at Laurel Park on October 27, 2011

Racing

Stakes events

Laurel Park hosts the following races in the seasons identified, listed by grade and sorted by inaugural year.
The following Graded events were held at Laurel Park in 2019.

Grade 3 Stakes Races:
 Barbara Fritchie Stakes     (1952)   Winter
 Baltimore Washington International Turf Cup   (1952)  Autumn
 General George Stakes     (1973)   Winter
 Frank J. De Francis Memorial Dash Stakes     (1990)    Autumn

State-bred Showcase Stakes Races:
 Maryland Million Classic     (1986)   Autumn
 Maryland Million Ladies     (1986)   Autumn
 Maryland Million Turf     (1986)   Autumn
 Maryland Million Sprint Handicap     (1986)   Autumn
 Maryland Million Distaff Handicap     (1986)   Autumn
 Maryland Million Nursery     (1986)   Autumn
 Maryland Million Lassie    (1986)   Autumn
 Maryland Million Oaks     (1986)   Autumn
 Maryland Million Turf Sprint Handicap     (2004)   Autumn

Listed Stakes Races:
The following ungraded stakes races are run at Laurel Park in the seasons identified, listed by inaugural year:

Discontinued Stakes Races:
 Annapolis Stakes    (1972–2000)
 Belair Stakes    (19??–2001)
 Bowie Stakes    (1962–2000)
 Chesapeake Stakes   (1912–2000)
 Dancing Count Stakes    (1985–2012)   Winter
 Horatius Stakes     (1994–2008)   Winter
 Humphrey S. Finney Stakes  (1986–2009)
 Squan Song Stakes     (1988–2011)    Autumn

Public transit
The racecourse can be accessed via MARC Train at the Laurel Race Track station, and RTA Buses 409 and 502.

References

External links

Horse racing venues in Maryland
Stronach Group
Laurel Park Racecourse
1911 establishments in Maryland
Sports venues completed in 1911
Buildings and structures in Anne Arundel County, Maryland
Sports in Anne Arundel County, Maryland